Pilotrochus is a genus of ants in the subfamily Myrmicinae containing the single species Pilotrochus besmerus. It is known from Madagascar.

The name of the genus is derived from Greek , "hair" + , "wheel"; the specific name is from Latin , "eight of twelve" + Greek , "part", referencing the eight-segmented antennae.

References

External links

Myrmicinae
Monotypic ant genera
Hymenoptera of Africa